Arsiyah (other forms of the word include - Lariçiyeh, al-Larisiya) was the name used for a group of Muslim mercenaries in the service of the Khazar Khaganate. Whether the Arsiyah were a single tribe or composed of Muslims from a number of different tribes is unclear. Also unclear is their origin; many historians regard them as deriving from Khwarazm, but some scholars point to the fact that "As" is the Turkic term for Alans and believe that the Arsiyah were Alanic in origin. Other scholars derive the name from Iranian Auruša (white).

According to Arabic text with French translation "Les Prairies d'or" translated by Charles Barbier de Meynard and Abel Pavet de Courteille. This word reads correctly from Arabic as - lariçiyeh. Which, according to the "Book of the Huns" by Alexandre Vincent, is translated from the Khazar language - guards.

From to Muslim sources, the lariçiyeh formed the core of the Khazar army and were extremely influential in Khazar politics, but these assertions may be designed to exaggerate the importance of the Muslim community in Khazaria. The lariçiyeh did often act independently of their government. Part of the treaty binding them to Khazar service guaranteed that they would not be used to fight other Muslims. In 913, the lariçiyeh ambushed a Varangian fleet that had been granted passage to the Caspian Sea by the Khazar government, wiping out thousands of Rus warriors.

See also 
 Erzya and Arsiyah

Notes

References
 Peter B. Golden. "The Conversion of the Khazars to Judaism." The World of the Khazars: New Perspectives. Leiden: Brill, 2007.
 Kevin Alan Brook. The Jews of Khazaria. 2nd ed. Rowman & Littlefield Publishers, Inc, 2006.
 Douglas M. Dunlop. The History of the Jewish Khazars. Princeton, N.J.: Princeton University Press, 1954. 
 Alexandre Vincent. «Book of the Huns» - Part I. Bibliothèque nationale de France - , 2016.
 Norman Golb and Omeljan Pritsak. Khazarian Hebrew Documents of the Tenth Century. Ithaca: Cornell University Press, 1982. 

Khazar military history
Mercenary units and formations of the Middle Ages